Coral is a chain of betting shops in the United Kingdom, owned by Entain. The Coral business was established by Joe Coral in 1926. It grew into an entertainment conglomerate before undergoing a series of ownership changes starting in 1981. As of 2015, Coral had 1,845 shops across the country.

History
Joe Coral (born Joseph Kagarlitski, 11 December 1904 – 16 December 1996) began his bookmaking business in 1926 and, although primarily concerned with operating betting pitches at racecourses, together with his friend Tom Bradbury-Pratt, he ran speedway meetings at Harringay and opened a credit office in the West End of London in 1943.

He had greyhound racing pitches at Harringay Stadium and then White City Stadium followed later by Clapton Stadium and Walthamstow Stadium before branching into betting offices.

He was one of the first to take advantage of the new legislation and opened his first licensed betting office in 1961. The new law was not intended to encourage betting and therefore shops were unattractive in appearance and devoid of any comforts.

Coral arranged a merger with another bookmaker, Mark Lane in 1971. By 1979, the company had become the Coral Leisure Group and had diversified to include a variety of other businesses, including casinos, hotels, restaurants, Pontins holiday camps, squash clubs, bingo clubs, and real estate.

In January 1981, the Coral Group was acquired by Bass plc and although it continued to retain the Coral name it became an integral part of the growing Bass Leisure.

In September 1998, Bass sold Coral to the Ladbroke Group for £363 million. The UK Government, however, ordered Ladbroke to sell Coral after the Monopolies and Mergers Commission found that the acquisition was anti-competitive. The Coral business, except for 59 shops in Ireland and Jersey, was sold in a management buyout financed by Morgan Grenfell Private Equity for £390 million in February 1999.

In November 1999, Coral acquired Eurobet, an online betting operation based in Gibraltar, for £7.1 million. The company changed its name to Coral Eurobet in May 2000. Coral Eurobet was then sold in a further management buy out in September 2002, which was backed by Charterhouse Development Capital.

In October 2005, Coral Eurobet was acquired for £2.18 billion by casino and bingo firm Gala, which changed its name to Gala Coral Group, creating the United Kingdom's third largest bookmaker and largest bingo operator. Coral and Eurobet continued to operate as divisions of Gala Coral.

In July 2009, Coral announced the relocation of their broadcasting department to Milton Keynes to a purpose built studio to manage the inception of its new television channel, Coral TV.

In May 2010, Coral bookmakers launched the Coral Dugout which was designed to offer in-depth football knowledge from ex-Premier League referee Graham Poll and sports presenter Jeff Stelling during the FIFA World Cup 2010. In November 2011, Coral announced they had signed for 30,793 sq ft of offices at One Stratford Place at Westfields £1.45bn Stratford City scheme opposite the Olympics stadium in east London.

In November 2016, Gala Coral was acquired by Ladbrokes, which changed its name to Ladbrokes Coral. Coral and Ladbrokes shops continued to operate under their respective names. GVC Holdings acquired Ladbrokes Coral in March 2018.

Marketing and advertising
As part of their experimental marketing campaign strategy, Coral engaged in the ‘RUN 4 IT’ campaign, requiring brand ambassadors dressed in trademark robber costumes, to physically ‘steal’ customers from competitor bookies. Over the course of this three week campaign, punters were encouraged to change their betting habits with the lure of a guaranteed win loyalty card and then walked by the ambassadors to the nearest Coral.  This campaign saw a 7% conversion rate and 2,447 customers were ‘stolen’ from 900 bookies.

References

Bookmakers
Gambling companies of the United Kingdom
British companies established in 1926
Entain